Androctonus crassicauda, the Arabian fat-tailed scorpion, is a species of dangerous scorpion usually found in North Africa and the Middle East.

Description
Androctonus crassicauda is a generalist desert species, an Old World scorpion. Adults can vary in colour from a light brown to reddish to blackish-brown, to black.

Distribution and habitat
This species is found mainly in the Palaearctic region, in such countries as Turkey, Iran, and other southwestern Asian nations. A. crassicauda lives in the ruins of old, neglected structures, and was considered a potential hazard for troops during the Persian Gulf conflict, though it was an unaggressive species that had no reports of stings. It also occurs in margins of desert (arid, semi-arid) places and sometimes accumulated vegetation debris.

Behavior
A nocturnal scorpion, it hides in crevices and under objects during the day, and at night hunts insects and other invertebrates, or small lizards.

Venom
The venom is mainly composed of neurotoxins, cardiotoxins, and possibly myotoxins. Victims of the sting have reported local effects (intense pain, redness and swelling). Systemic effects include heart malfunctions, remote internal bleeding, visual disturbance, and respiratory problems. Deaths mostly occur with respiratory arrest, heart failure, and shock. The LD50 for this species is 0.08 mg/kg (IV) and 0.40 mg/kg (SC).

Antivenom
Antivenom produced by this species has been used in Turkey to treat all scorpion stings since 1942.

References

Buthidae
Animals described in 1807
Fauna of Iran
Invertebrates of the Arabian Peninsula